For an Evening (French: Pour un soir) is a 1931 French drama film directed by Jean Godard and starring Jean Gabin, Colette Darfeuil and Georges Melchior. The film's full release was significantly delayed and only reached cinemas in early 1934. Some scenes were shot at the Le Lido cabaret, then at its pre-war location on the Champs-Élysées.

Synopsis
A sailor on shore leave from Toulon encounters a Parisian singer on holiday in St Tropez. They begin a romance but for her it is just a casual adventure while he becomes obsessed with her in a downward spiral that eventually leads him to commit suicide.

Cast
 Colette Darfeuil as Stella Maris
 Jean Gabin as Jean
 Georges Melchior 
 Guy Ferrant	
 Cilly Andersen
 Jacqueline Ford
 Régine Dhally

References

Bibliography 
 Harriss, Joseph. Jean Gabin: The Actor Who Was France. McFarland, 2018.

External links 
 

1931 films
French drama films
French black-and-white films
1931 drama films
1930s French-language films
Films shot in Paris
1930s French films